"The Secret Code" is the 117th episode of NBC sitcom Seinfeld. This was the seventh episode of the seventh season. It aired on November 9, 1995. In this episode, George is unwilling to share his ATM code with his fiancée Susan, and finds himself entrapped in awkward social situations after he loses his talent for lying. Meanwhile, Elaine finds herself infatuated with a man because he cannot recall their first meeting, Jerry's plans to appear in a television commercial are repeatedly frustrated by his foot falling asleep, and Kramer tries to help out the local fire department.

Plot
As Elaine wrote a good piece on Himalayan Walking Shoes for the J. Peterman catalog, Peterman is taking her out for dinner. As she finds his stories boring, she pleads with Jerry to join her. He in turn tricks George into coming. George and Susan fight after George refuses to tell her his ATM code.

Elaine does not appear at the dinner, on account of a date with Fred, a friend of Jerry. Elaine had met him at a party, but his lack of recall for the meeting mesmerizes her. After it becomes clear that Elaine is not coming, Jerry makes up an excuse to leave, leaving George to have an awkward dinner with Peterman. On the drive home, Peterman receives a call that his mother is "at death's door", and George is forced to stay the night. While Peterman is out of the room, George, whilst keeping her company, reveals his code ("Bosco") to Peterman's mother. She seizes upon the word, and repeats it at her moment of death, leaving Peterman bewildered.

Jerry meets with appliance store owner Leapin' Larry, who walks with a prosthetic leg, to discuss appearing in television commercials. After Jerry's foot falls asleep, he offends Leapin' Larry, who believes Jerry's limping to be an impression. After Jerry explains the misunderstanding, they meet again, but Jerry's foot once again falls asleep. Not wanting to offend Leapin' Larry again, he stamps his foot, accidentally causing a can of paint thinner to spill onto some exposed wiring, starting a fire.

Kramer buys a police scanner and decides to help at the New York City Fire Department, bringing a map of shortcuts to the local firehouse. When they receive a call about the fire at Leapin' Larry's, Kramer accidentally knocks out the rear driver of the fire engine, forcing him to take the tiller, realizing his lifelong dream. However, he is unable to steer correctly and crashes the fire engine, allowing the fire to spread further.

The fire occurs down the block from Peterman's mother's funeral; George is attending, but Elaine excused herself for another date with Fred. The attendees rush to find a man with his sleeve stuck in an ATM; Peterman insists that George give the man his card, forcing George to finally reveal his code. Susan later teases George about his code. Jerry finds a passage in the latest J. Peterman catalog in which Peterman accuses George of killing his mother.

Production
The inspiration for the Elaine/Fred plot was Jerry Seinfeld's practice of always saying "Nice to see you" instead of "Nice to meet you." Seinfeld had explained to writers Alec Berg and Jeff Schaffer that "Nice to see you" is acceptable even if one has never met the other person before, while "Nice to meet you" is seen as offensive if they have previously met.

In this episode J. Peterman's complete first name, Jacopo, is revealed, more explicitly differentiating him from the J. Peterman Company's real-life founder, John Peterman. Berg and Schaffer named the character after their local pizzeria, Jacopo's.

Seinfeld writer Spike Feresten had a police scanner; the Seinfeld crew enjoyed listening to the conversations and eventually acquired their own for the offices, inspiring the episode's Kramer story. The scenes at the fire station were filmed on location. The fire truck Kramer rides would not fit on the show's sound stage, so the crew put it on a New York street with a large blue screen suspended behind actor Michael Richards, whose body movements combined with the inserted moving background to create the illusion that the fire truck was in motion. A few shots from the scene were filmed on location by a second unit with a Michael Richards stunt double actually riding a moving fire truck.

Kramer was scripted to call Jerry "S1Banga", a fictional player name from a soccer video game published by Sega, but Michael Richards tripped over the name and said "Munjamba" instead. Berg and Schaffer decided not to demand another take since "S1Banga" was an inside joke and they were confident viewers would find Richards' version just as funny.

References

External links
 

Seinfeld (season 7) episodes
1995 American television episodes